Dog Eat Dog is a 2016 American action thriller film  directed by Paul Schrader (also served as the cast of the film for the first time). The screenplay by Matthew Wilder is based on Edward Bunker's 1995 novel of the same name. The film stars Nicolas Cage and Willem Dafoe.

The film was the closing entry for the Directors' Fortnight section at the 2016 Cannes Film Festival.

Plot 
Three former prisoners - Troy, Mad Dog and Diesel - are hired to kidnap a baby and share a big ransom payment.

Cast 
 Nicolas Cage as Troy
 Willem Dafoe as Mad Dog
 Christopher Matthew Cook as Diesel
 Omar Dorsey as Moon Man
 Paul Schrader as Grecco The Greek
 Louisa Krause as Zoe
 Melissa Bolona as Lina
 Chelcie Melton as Sheila
 Chelsea Mee as Madeleine
 John Patrick Jordan as Jack Cates
 Magi Avila as Nanny Carmen
 Jeff Hilliard as Gun Enthusiast
 Sam Caminero as Dan Rubin

Production 
Principal photography on the film began on October 19, 2015 in Cleveland, Ohio. Filming also took place in Sheffield Lake, and it ended on November 23, 2015.

Release 
The film had its premiere as the closing entry for the Directors' Fortnight section at the 2016 Cannes Film Festival on May 20, 2016. It was released on November 4, 2016 in the United States.

Reception 
On review aggregator website Rotten Tomatoes, the film holds an approval rating of 49% based on 71 reviews, with an average rating of 5.06/10. The website's critical consensus reads, "Dog Eat Dogs refreshing bundle of quirks and surfeit of visual style aren't quite enough to compensate for an aimlessly forgettable story." On Metacritic, which assigns a normalized rating to reviews, the film has a weighted average score of 53 out of 100, based on 19 critics, indicating "mixed or average reviews".

Peter Bradshaw of The Guardian gave the film 4 out of 5 stars, writing, "It's the right director for the right project and the result is Schrader's best for years: a lairy, nasty, tasty crime thriller built on black-comic chaos." Todd McCarthy of The Hollywood Reporter wrote, "A rare film to have been shot in Cleveland, Dog Eat Dog definitely looks like it was shot on the cheap but puts what it needs to up on the screen with vigor and wit." Jesse Cataldo of Slant Magazine gave the film 1.5 out of 4 stars and commented that "The film has a few thrilling moments, but its pleasures are fleeting and always balanced by oppressive ugliness, representing an even deeper dive into a dismal new aesthetic founded on chaos rather than contemplation."

References

External links 
 

2016 films
American action thriller films
American crime thriller films
2016 black comedy films
2016 action thriller films
2016 crime thriller films
Films shot in Cleveland
Films directed by Paul Schrader
Films based on crime novels
Films based on American novels
Films with screenplays by Paul Schrader
American black comedy films
2010s English-language films
2010s American films